Randy Schlappi (born September 23, 1985), known professionally as Randy Montana, is an American country singer signed to Mercury Records Nashville. His first album, Randy Montana, was released in 2011.

Early and personal life
Randy Schlappi is the son of singer-songwriter Billy Montana.

He is married to Montgomery "Gummy" Lee, daughter of retired stock car racer Kyle Petty, and granddaughter of Richard Petty. The couple have one daughter Sullivan Mae Montana born February 27, 2012, and one son Gunnar West Montana born December 10, 2014.

Musical career
In March 2010, Montana released his debut single "Ain't Much Left of Lovin' You," to radio. The song entered at No. 59 on the Billboard Hot Country Songs charts dated for the week ending April 3, 2010. His self-titled album's second single "1,000 Faces" released to country radio on 2011.

Karlie Justus of Engine 145 gave "Ain't Much Left of Lovin' You" a thumbs-up, calling Montana's voice "raspy" and comparing the song's theme to George Jones's "The Grand Tour." Matt Bjorke of Roughstock rated it three-and-a-half stars out of five, saying that the song is a "grow-on-you type" but that it "really feels like a genuine and proper introduction."

Concert Tours
Own The Night Tour  with Lady Antebellum (2011)

Discography

Studio albums

Extended plays

Singles

Music videos

References

External links
Official Website

American country singer-songwriters
American male singer-songwriters
Living people
Singer-songwriters from New York (state)
Musicians from Albany, New York
1985 births
Mercury Records artists
21st-century American singers
Country musicians from New York (state)
21st-century American male singers